The Latin Grammy Award for Best Urban/Fusion Performance is an honor presented annually by the Latin Academy of Recording Arts & Sciences at the Latin Grammy Awards, a ceremony that recognizes excellence and promotes a wider awareness of cultural diversity and contributions of Latin recording artists in the United States and internationally.

According to the category description guide for the 2013 Latin Grammy Awards, the award is for vocal or instrumental singles or tracks of newly recorded material containing at least 51 percent playing time of Urban music subgenres such as Hip Hop, Rap, Dancehall, R&B, Reggaeton, and could include a fusion mix of other genres. It is awarded to solo artists, duos or groups.

Enrique Iglesias is the only artist to win this category twice. Daddy Yankee and Nicky Jam is the most nominated with three, both winning once. In 2014, "Bailando" by Enrique Iglesias featuring Descemer Bueno & Gente De Zona became the first song to be nominated for this award and for Record of the Year. In 2018, "Malamente" by Rosalía won this award and was nominated for Record of the Year. Other songs nominated for both this award and Record of the Year are "Chantaje" by Shakira featuring Maluma in 2017; "China" by Anuel AA, Daddy Yankee, Karol G, Ozuna, J Balvin in 2020 and "Pa Mis Muchachas" by Christina Aguilera, Nicki Nicole, Becky G featuring Nathy Peluso in 2022.

Recipients

2010s

2020s

References

External links 

Official website of the Latin Grammy Awards

 
Awards established in 2013
Urban Fusion Performance